Tabilk is a closed railway station on the Goulburn Valley railway in the township of Tabilk, Victoria, Australia. The station opened at the same time as the railway from Mangalore to Shepparton on 13 January 1880 and closed in 1985. The platform was on the east side of the line, with the dirt mound remaining today. Prior to its closure, in 1975, the platform was shortened at the Up (towards Spencer Street) end of the station.

References

Disused railway stations in Victoria (Australia)